Boli Khela or Bali Khela is a traditional form of wrestling in Bangladesh, particularly popular in the Chittagong area considered as a national game of the district. It is a form of combat sport involving grappling type techniques such as clinch fighting, throws and takedowns, joint locks, pins and other grappling holds. It is one of the oldest traditions of the Chittagong. The sporting event, held in the first month of the Bengali year date of 7th, always takes place at Madarsha Union as Mokkaro boli khela & same month date of 12th, always takes place at Laldighi Maidan as Jabbarer Boli khela.

Etymology
Boli means wrestler or a powerful person in Bengali, while Khela denotes a game. So, Boli Khela means game of the powerful person.

History
Boli Khela was introduced in the last 19th century by Kader Boxo. He was a landlord and resident of Satkania Upazila under Madarsha Union in Chittagong district.  Reportedly, beginning in 1879, during the first month of each year, he collected dues from his renters and arranged a boli khela match. After his death, the 7th of Boishakh, the first month of the Bengali calendar year, started being called "Mokkaro Boli Khela". 

A 20th century merchant, Abdul Jabbar Saodagor from Chittagong, arranged a boli khela in 1907 match to cultivate a sport that would prepare the youth to fight against British rule. Broad appeal for the sport began at the end of the First World War but subsided at the end of the Second World War.

Participation
The arena is either a circular or square shape, measuring at least fourteen to twenty feet across. Rather than using modern mats, Boli wrestlers train and compete on dirt floors. Match started in a sandy wrestling ground. Each year, Boli Khela attracts new participates and fans because the sheer enjoyment of the sport is not only contagious for local enthusiasts but inspires tourists to Bangladesh an opportunity to get a glimpse of an exciting and unique event. Fans of many countries come every year to see Boli khela.

Rules
The event starts at afternoon in a festive mood with the music of 'Dabor' (one kind of folk drum)and 'Sanai' (folk flute). Each match lasts about 25–30 minutes but if both competitors agree, the length of the final match may be extended up to 10–15 minutes.

Great practitioners
 Didar Boli, a trader from Omkhali under Ramu upazila in Cox's Bazar district.
 Oli Hossain of Brahmanbaria district.
 Marma Singh, a sub inspector of Gulshan Police Station in Dhaka.

See also
 Kabaddi
 Lathi khela

References

External links

 JABBARER BOLI KHELA
 The Sport of Boli Khela

Sport in Chittagong
Bangladeshi martial arts
South Asian martial arts
Sports originating in South Asia
Traditional sports of Bangladesh